The Corry Baronetcy, of Dunraven in the County of Antrim, is a title in the Baronetage of the United Kingdom. It was created on 10 September 1883 for James Corry, Conservative Member of Parliament for Belfast and Armagh Mid. The second Baronet was a Director of the Cunard Steamship Company. 

The Corry family is of Scottish descent but settled near Newtownards, County Down in the early 17th century.  The title's reference to "Dunraven" is derived from the first baronet's residence on the Malone Road, Belfast.

Corry baronets, of Dunraven (1885)
Sir James Porter Corry, 1st Baronet (1826–1891)
Sir William Corry, 2nd Baronet (1859–1926)
Sir James Perowne Ivo Myles Corry, 3rd Baronet (1892–1987)
Sir William James Corry, 4th Baronet (1924–2000)
Sir James Michael Corry, 5th Baronet (born 1946)

The heir apparent is the present holder's son William James Alexander Corry (born 1981).

Notes

References
Kidd, Charles, Williamson, David (editors). Debrett's Peerage and Baronetage (1990 edition). New York: St Martin's Press, 1990.

Corry